Kiarash Anvari (born 16 November 1977 in Tehran, Iran) is an Iranian  film director, video artist, and scriptwriter.

Anvari received his B.A. degree in film making from Sooreh Higher Education Institute in Tehran. After receiving his master's degree in film studies from the University of Provence in Aix-en-Provence, France, he continued his studies on a Ph.D. in film philosophy.

Filmography

Director
2017: The Pot and The Oak.
2006: Duet (2006 film).
2004: An Abstract Expression.
2003: Rapid Eye Movement.
2003: Dirooz, Dirooz Panzdah Daghigh-eh Ghabl.

... aka Yesterday, yesterday 15 minutes earlier (International: English title).
2002: Man pak konande-h hastam!

... aka I am a Purifier! (International: English title).
2000: ...Va man dar khoshbakhti-e shirin be donya amadam!

... aka ...And I was born to sweet delight!(International: English title).
1998: Switch (two minutes of a miserable life!).

Producer
2022: Summer with Hope
2017: AVA.
2009: The Kid and the Kite (co-producer).
2009: Shoosh, Lab-e Khat (co-producer).
2006: Duet (2006 film).
2004: An Abstract Expression.
2003: Rapid Eye Movement.
2003: Dirooz, Dirooz Panzdah Daghigh-eh Ghabl.

... aka Yesterday, yesterday 15 minutes earlier (International: English title).
2002: Man pak konande-h hastam!

... aka I am a Purifier! (International: English title).

Writer
2009: The Kid and the Kite.
2009: Shoosh, Lab-e Khat (co-written with Sadaf Foroughi).
2007: Féminin, Masculin (co-written with Sadaf Foroughi).
2006: Duet (2006 film).
2004: An Abstract Expression.
2003: Rapid Eye Movement.
2003: Dirooz, Dirooz Panzdah Daghigh-eh Ghabl.

... aka Yesterday, yesterday 15 minutes earlier (International: English title).
2002: Man pak konande-h hastam!

... aka I am a Purifier! (International: English title).
2000: ...Va man dar khoshbakhti-e shirin be donya amadam!

... aka ...And I was born to sweet delight! (International: English title).

References

External links 

Kiarash Anvari at Berlinale Talent Campus
Duet (2006) at Palm Springs International Short Film Festival
13th Annual Bite the Mango Film Festival 
Duet (2006) at 5ème Festival Signes de Nuit, Paris
...And I Was Born to Sweet Delight! (2000) at Video Mundi Film and Video Festival, Chicago Cultural Center
...And I Was Born to Sweet Delight! (2000)  at Video Mundi Film and Video Festival in a program called "DOMESTIC INSOMNIA"

Iranian film directors
Iranian film producers
Iranian screenwriters
Iranian experimental filmmakers
Mass media people from Tehran
1977 births
Living people
University of Provence alumni